Rahimabad (also Romanized as Raḩīmābād) is a village in Darbqazi Rural District, in the Central District of Nishapur County, Razavi Khorasan Province, Iran. At the 2006 census, its population was 173, in 47 families.

References 

Populated places in Nishapur County